The order Pygocephalomorpha is an extinct group of peracarid crustaceans. Pygocephalomorpha were abundant from the Carboniferous until their extinction in the Permian.

Families

The order contains extinct five families, and seven genera incertae sedis:

Jerometichenoriidae 
Jerometichenoria 
Notocarididae 
Notocaris 
Paulocaris 
Pygocephalidae 
Anthracaris 
Mamayocaris 
Pygocephalus 
Tealliocarididae 
Tealliocaris 
Tylocarididae 
Chaocaris 
Fujianocaris 
Liocaris 
Pseudogalathea 
Tylocaris 
Pygocephalomorpha 
Bellocaris 
Hoplita 
Iraticaris 
Permocaris 
Pittinucaris 
Pygaspis 
Sosiocaris

See also
Tealliocaris

References

Prehistoric Malacostraca
Carboniferous crustaceans
Permian animals
Carboniferous first appearances
Permian extinctions
Crustacean orders